Perrys Corner is an unincorporated community in Imperial County, California.

References

Unincorporated communities in Imperial County, California
Unincorporated communities in California